Agnieszka Radwańska won the 2016 China Open Women's Singles tennis title, defeating Johanna Konta in the final, 6–4, 6–2.
Garbiñe Muguruza was the defending champion, but lost in the third round to Petra Kvitová.

Seeds

The four Wuhan semifinalists received a bye into the second round. They were as follows:
  Dominika Cibulková
  Simona Halep
  Svetlana Kuznetsova
  Petra Kvitová

Draw

Finals

Top half

Section 1

Section 2

Bottom half

Section 3

Section 4

Qualifying

Seeds

Qualifiers

Draw

First qualifier

Second qualifier

Third qualifier

Fourth qualifier

Fifth qualifier

Sixth qualifier

Seventh qualifier

Eighth qualifier

External links
 Main Draw
 Qualifying Draw

China Open - Singles